This list is divided into proprietary or free software, and open source software, with several comparison tables of different product and vendor characteristics. It also includes a section of project collaboration software, which is a standard feature in collaboration platforms.

Collaborative software

Comparison of notable software

Systems listed on a light purple background are no longer in active development.

General Information

Comparison of unified communications features

Comparison of collaborative software features

Comparison of targets

Open source software
The following are open source applications for collaboration:

Standard client–server software 
Access Grid, for audio and video-based collaboration
Axigen
Citadel/UX, with support for native groupware clients (Kontact, Novell Evolution, Microsoft Outlook) and web interface
Cyn.in
EGroupware, with support for native groupware clients (Kontact, Novell Evolution, Microsoft Outlook) and web interface
Group-Office groupware and CRM
Kolab, various native PIM clients
Kopano
OpenGroupware.org
phpGroupWare
Scalix
SOGo, integrated email, calendaring with Apple iCal, Mozilla Thunderbird and native Outlook compatibility
Teambox, Basecamp-style project management software with focus on GTD task management and conversations. (Only V3 and prior are open-source.)
Zarafa
Zentyal, with support for native groupware clients (Kontact, Novell Evolution) natively for Microsoft Outlook and web interface
Zimbra
Zulip

Groupware: Web-based software 
Axigen
Bricolage, content management system
BigBlueButton, Web meetings
Collabora Online, Enterprise-ready edition of LibreOffice enabling real-time collaborative editing of documents, spreadsheets, presentations and graphics
DotNetNuke, also called DNN: module-based, evolved from ASP 1.0 demo applications
EGroupware, a free open source groupware software intended for businesses from small to enterprises
EtherPad, collaborative drafting with chat
Feng Office Community Edition
FusionForge, has wiki, forums, mailing lists, FTP, SSH, subdomains, hosting, email alias, backups, CVS/SVN, task management
Group-Office, Web-based groupware for sharing calendars, files, e-mail, CRM, Projects, Mobile Synchronization and much more.
Horde
HumHub a free and open-source enterprise social network solution
IceWarp Server
Jumper 2.0, collaborative search engine and knowledge management platform
Kolab Groupware, integrated Roundcube web frontend
Kune, collaborative federated social network, based on Apache Wave
Loomio, for making decisions together (AGPL).
MediaWiki, which provides core content management and integrates with many other tools via extensions
Nextcloud, file hosting service, functionally similar to Dropbox, Office 365 or Google Drive when used with its integrated office suite solutions Collabora Online or OnlyOffice
OnlyOffice Community Server, available for Microsoft and Linux
OpenBroadcaster LPFM IPTV broadcast automation tools
Overleaf for creating LaTeX documents
phpGroupWare
Simple Groupware
SOGo, integrated email, calendaring with Apple iCal, Mozilla Thunderbird and native Outlook compatibility
Tiki Wiki CMS Groupware, has wiki, forums, calendar, ticket system, workflow engine
Tine 2.0
Tonido, free collaborative software with workspace synchronizing, Web access from personal desktop; cross-platform
Zarafa, full MAPI MS Exchange replacement for Linux, GPL+proprietary
Kopano, full MAPI MS Exchange replacement for Linux, GPL+proprietary
Zentyal
Zimbra

Other 
Alfresco, enterprise content management system: document management, workflow, and portal
Drupal Framework, open source content management framework: document management, web pages, attachments, forums, photos, social profiles, collaboration tools
Liferay Enterprise Portal, open source enterprise portal: document management, wiki, social tools, workflow
LogicalDOC, document management system: document management, workflow
Nuxeo EP, enterprise content management system: document management, workflow
OpenKM, open source document management system: document management

Project collaboration software

Web-based software

Ceiton, workflow-based project management with Gantt chart, scheduling calendar and time-tracking
Central Desktop, has project management, wiki, file upload, review and approve, calendar, document management
Clarizen, online on-demand, collaborative project execution software
dotProject
Easy Projects
EGroupware, is free open source groupware software intended for businesses from small to enterprises
Feng Office Community Edition
Fle3
Gitea
GitLab
Group-Office, Web-based groupware for sharing calendars, files, e-mail, CRM, Projects, Mobile Synchronization and much more.
GroveSite, online collaboration, project and document management; online relational database
Horde
InLoox, web-based project management and collaboration software with Outlook integration
LiquidPlanner, web-based project management and collaboration software
Mindquarry, has document synchronizing, wiki, task management
PBworks is a commercial real-time collaborative editing (RTCE) system
phpGroupWare, has a project collaboration module
Plone, content management
project.net
Projectplace, full suite of collaborative project tools
Redmine, for software projects includes issue tracking, wiki, basic file and document management with hooks to major version control systems: SVN, Git, etc.
Simple Groupware
TeamLab, has forums, blogs, bookmarks, wiki, task management, instant messaging, mobile version, CRM, online document editors
TogetherJS by Mozilla, an open-source javascript library that can transform any web application into a real-time collaborative editor.
Trac, has wiki, document management, ticket system and version control system
Traction TeamPage integrated action tracking, wiki, live status, notification, and streams organized by person, task, project, and shared permissioned space.
web2project, a dotproject fork with active current development and some innovations: subprojects, etc.
WiserEarth, social network and database that include an open-source Groupware (closed)
Wrike, interactive web-based project management software and tools for remote collaboration
Zoho Projects, a web-based project management software with collaboration features such as Interactive Feeds, Chat, Calendar, Forum, Wiki Pages and shared Document management

Other 
Croquet project, collaborative virtual environment
Open Wonderland, open source Java toolkit to make collaborative 3D virtual worlds
Wiki engines: see List of wiki software
Realtime editors: see Collaborative real-time editor
Revision control for software engineering projects: see Comparison of revision control software
Collaborative development environment
Tools for collaborative writing such as O'Reilly Media's wiki-like git-managed authoring platform Atlas

Comparison

See also 
Cloud collaboration
Collaborative workflow
Collaborative editor
Comparison of project management software
Comparison of wiki software
Document collaboration
Document-centric collaboration
List of wiki farms
List of wiki software

References

 
Collaborative software

de:Kategorie:Kollaborationssoftware